The Játvarðar Saga (in full Saga Játvarðar konungs hins helga), is an Icelandic saga about the life of Edward the Confessor, King of England (1042–1066). It was compiled in the 14th century, in Iceland, using a number of earlier English sources as well as the French Chronicon Universale Anonymi Laudunensis (or a source common with it). It was translated into English in 1894 by George Webbe Dasent. Among the various details contained in the saga, there is an account of the origin of an English colony in the Black Sea founded by one "Siward earl of Gloucester" (Sigurðr jarl af Glocestr), a refugee of the Norman Conquest of England.

Notes

References

Further reading

External links
 

14th-century literature
Sagas of Icelanders
Edward the Confessor